The Awesomes is an American animated comedy series, which premiered on August 1, 2013, on Hulu. The series was created by Seth Meyers and Mike Shoemaker, and stars Seth Meyers, Ike Barinholtz, Emily Spivey, Taran Killam, Kenan Thompson, Bobby Lee, Paula Pell, Rashida Jones, and Josh Meyers as the superhero team The Awesomes, who attempt to put themselves back together in the face of intense media and government skepticism after the original team disbands. The series also stars Bill Hader and Rachel Dratch in supporting roles.

, 30 episodes of The Awesomes have been released.

Series overview

Episodes

Season 1 (2013)

Season 2 (2014)

Season 3 (2015)
On August 19, 2014, Hulu renewed The Awesomes for a third season, which premiered on September 8, 2015 on Hulu.

References

External links

Lists of American adult animated television series episodes
Lists of American sitcom episodes